Sei più bravo di un ragazzino di 5ª? is an Italian game show based on the original American format of Are You Smarter Than a 5th Grader?. The show is hosted by the Italian presenter Riccardo Rossi. Currently is exclusively shown on the Italian television channels SKY Uno and Cielo.

Italian game shows
2007 Italian television series debuts
Are You Smarter than a 5th Grader?
2000s Italian television series
Sky Uno original programming